The El Gouna International 2016 is the men's edition of the 2016 El Gouna International, which is a PSA World Series event. The event took place at the Abu Tig Marina in El Gouna in Egypt from 24 to 29 April 2016. Mohamed El Shorbagy won his third El Gouna International trophy, beating Grégory Gaultier in the final.

Prize money and ranking points
For 2016, the prize purse was $150,000. The prize money and points breakdown is as follows:

Seeds

Draw and results

References

External links
PSA El Gouna International 2016 website
El Gouna International 2015 squashsite website

Squash tournaments in Egypt
Men's El Gouna International
Men's El Gouna International